Sparganothis minimetallica is a species of moth   of the family Tortricidae. It is found in southern Florida in the United States.

The wingspan is about 9 mm.

References

Moths described in 2012
Sparganothis